Poroj is a village in the municipality of Tetovo, North Macedonia. It used to be part of the former municipality of Džepčište.

History
According to the 1467-68 Ottoman defter, Poroj appears as being inhabited by an Orthodox Christian Albanian population, which had a mixed Slav-Albanian anthroponomy.

The names include: Behadir, son of Shoq; Dabzhiv, son of Miron; Grop-çe, brother of Vesel-ko; Dimit-ri, son of Stepan; Nikolla, son of Sorgo; Stepani, son of Grop-çe; Gjuro, son of Dano; Dimitri, son of Kroso; Kolja, son of Arbanas; Lush-iq, son of Gjur-in; Gropan, son of Dimitr; Nik-o,  son of Andre-ja; Bogdan, son of Pulaq (Pulja); Nikola, his brother Shoqi; Gjuro, son of Pula-q; Lazor, son of Radi-q; Daba's son-in-law Donçe; Dac-a, his son; Roza, widow.

Demographics
According to the 2021 census, the village had a total of 2.653 inhabitants. Ethnic groups in the village include:

Albanians 2.558
Macedonians 2
Bosniaks 1
Others 92

Sports
Local football club KF Skënderbeu have played in the Macedonian Third League.

Notable People 
Mujdin Aliu

References

External links

Villages in Tetovo Municipality
Albanian communities in North Macedonia